Buwenda is a small village in Uganda located in the Bugiri district, close to the town of Jinja.

References

Populated places in Uganda